Janrae Frank was an American journalist, writer and editor known primarily for her work in science fiction and fantasy. She wrote extensively on the subject of women and feminism in speculative fiction.

Life and career
Her first published short story, Wolves of Nakesht, appeared in the 1980 World Fantasy Award-winning anthology Amazons! (edited by Jessica Amanda Salmonson). This story introduced her most famous character, Chimquar the Lionhawk, and featured what are arguably her central themes: gender ambiguity and women of martial puissance. Other contributions in this field include  Women Warriors and Earth Mothers and New Eves: Science Fiction About the Extraordinary Women of Today and Tomorrow, an anthology of stories which traced the contributions and history of women in science fiction from the 1920s on, decade by decade. This anthology has been used in many women's study courses on science fiction.

Her film journalism has been published in the cult magazine Cinefantastique as well as Movieline.

Lately, she was better known for dark fantasy series such as the Dark Brothers of the Light and the Journey of the Sacred King quartet.

Published works

Writer

Chimquar the Lionhawk
Wolves of Nakesht, published in Amazons! (DAW, 1979)
In the Darkness, Hunting (paperback) (Wildside Press, 2004)
In the Darkness, Hunting: Tales of Chimquar the Lionhawk (Renaissance Ebooks, 2005)

Dark Brothers of the Light series

Blood Rites (Renaissance Ebooks, 2005)
Blood Heresy (Renaissance Ebooks, 2005)
Blood Dawn (Renaissance Ebooks, 2005)
Blood Wraiths (Renaissance Ebooks, 2005)
Blood Paladin (Renaissance Ebooks, 2005)
Blood Arcane (Renaissance Ebooks, 2006)
Blood Harvest (Renaissance Ebooks, 2006)
Blood Hope (Renaissance Ebooks, 2008)
Blood Lies (Smashwords, 2011)
Blood Journey (forthcoming)

Journey of the Sacred King series

My Sister's Keeper (Renaissance Ebooks, 2005)
Sins of the Mother (Renaissance Ebooks, 2005)
My Father's House (Renaissance Ebooks, 2006)
Children of Wrath (Renaissance Ebooks, 2006)

Lycan Blood series
Serpent's Quest (Renaissance eBooks, 2006)
Fireborn Law (Renaissance eBooks, 2007)
If Truth Dies (Renaissance eBooks, 2007)
Kynyr's War (Renaissance eBooks, 2007)
The Exile's Return (Renaissance eBooks, 2007)
Kady's Vengeance (Renaissance eBooks, 2008)
The Shadowed Princes (Renaissance eBooks, 2009)

Short fiction
Visiting the Neighbors (I, Vampire: Interviews with the Undead, 1994)
The Tale That Launched a Thousand Ships (Greatest Uncommon Denominator Magazine, 2007)

Essays
Sex, Swords, and Superstition: A Close Look at Phyllis Ann Karr's Thorn and Frostflower (Thrust, 1985)
A Funny Thing Happened on the Way to This Review (Thrust, 1986)
Dead in Suburbia, or Whatever Happened to Feminism in SF? (Thrust, 1987)

Editor
(with Jean Marie Stine and Forrest J Ackerman) New Eves: Science Fiction About the Extraordinary Women of Today and Tomorrow (Longmeadow Press, 1994)

Notes

External links
Godwar Central - official website (final complete version) archived at The Wayack Machine

American science fiction writers
American women short story writers
20th-century American short story writers
1954 births
2014 deaths
Women science fiction and fantasy writers
American women novelists
21st-century American short story writers
20th-century American novelists
21st-century American novelists
20th-century American women writers
21st-century American women writers
American women journalists
20th-century American non-fiction writers
21st-century American non-fiction writers